Zeyni (also Romanized as Zeynī and Zīnī; also known as Zani, Zeini Olya, and Zeni) is a village in Baqeran Rural District, in the Central District of Birjand County, South Khorasan Province, Iran. At the 2006 census, its population was 124, in 38 families.

References 

Populated places in Birjand County